Jon Phillip Lugbill (born May 27, 1961 in Wauseon, Ohio) is a whitewater canoe slalom racer. During the 1980s, he participated in international racing in Men's Individual C1 (a decked canoe, similar to a kayak). He is the only slalom racer to ever appear on the Wheaties box.

Lugbill started canoeing in the 1970s in the Washington, D.C. area. He often trained daily in his C1 using slalom gates set up on a feeder canal next to the Potomac River near Great Falls.  During the winter, Lugbill and his fellow paddlers also trained in the David Taylor Model Basin. He and some other fellow racers (notably David Hearn) developed new designs of low volume decked canoes, using nylon, kevlar and fiberglass cloths mixed with epoxy resin.

In 1979, Lugbill won the C1 men's individual World Championship in canoe slalom at the first World Championships to be held on the North American continent at Jonquière (Canada). This was the first time an American had won a gold medal in the world canoe slalom championships. Lugbill went on to win gold in his category several more times; 1981 at Bala (Wales), 1983 at Meran (Italy), 1987 at Bourg St. Maurice (France), and 1989 at the Savage River (USA). In 1985 at Augsburg (then in West Germany), Lugbill had to settle for the silver medal after David Hearn bested him for the gold. Lugbill also won seven consecutive world championship gold medals in the C1 team event (1979-1991). His older brother Ron was part of the gold medal winning C1 team in 1981.

Lugbill won three consecutive overall world cup titles in the C1 category including the inaugural edition in 1988.

During the peak of Lugbill's career, whitewater canoeing was not included on the competition program of the Summer Olympic Games. His only appearance on the Olympic stage came in 1992, when the sport returned to the Olympics after a 20-year absence. On the man-made course in La Seu d'Urgell, Spain, Lugbill placed fourth after being assessed for a five-second gate touch penalty at Gate 23 during his first run.

Lugbill is the Executive Director of Metropolitan Richmond Sports Backers and resides in Richmond, Virginia. The Sports Backers have been named the best Sports Commission in America an unprecedented 4 times by the National Association of Sports Commissions.

Lugbill lived in Archbold, Ohio until he was three years old. Then he moved to Vienna and then Fairfax, Virginia. He attended Lanier Intermediate School in Fairfax and Oakton High School. He graduated from the University of Virginia. He has two daughters, Kelly and Stephanie.

World Cup individual podiums

References

1961 births
American male canoeists
Canoeists at the 1992 Summer Olympics
Living people
Olympic canoeists of the United States
People from Wauseon, Ohio
Sportspeople from Richmond, Virginia
Whitewater sports people
Medalists at the ICF Canoe Slalom World Championships